Borshchyovo is a rural locality (a selo) in Progressovskoye Rural Settlement, Paninsky District, Voronezh Oblast, Russia. The population was 357 as of 2010. There are 8 streets.

Geography 
Borshchyovo is located on the right bank of the Bityug River, 33 km northeast of Panino (the district's administrative centre) by road. Borshchevskiye Peski is the nearest rural locality.

References 

Rural localities in Paninsky District